The Elusates were an Aquitani tribe dwelling in the modern Gers department, around present-day Eauze, France during the Iron Age and the Roman period.

They were subjugated in 56 BC by the Roman forces of Caesar's legatus P. Licinius Crassus.

Name 
They are mentioned as Elusates by Caesar (mid-1st c. BC) and Pliny (1st c. AD), and as Elusa on the Tabula Peutingeriana (5th c. AD).

The etymology of the ethnonym Elusates remains uncertain, but the root elus(a)- is generally presumed to be of Aquitanian origin. Alternatively, a connection with the Celtic root *elu(o)- ('numerous') has also been proposed.

The city of Eauze, attested in the 4th century AD as civitas Elusa, is named after the tribe.

Geography 
The Elusates dwelled south of the Sotiates, north of the Onobrisates, east of the Tarusates, west of the Lactorates, and northwest of the Ausci.

The pre-Roman oppidum of Esbérous was located 3km northwest of Eauze.

During the Roman period, their chief town was known as Elusa (modern Eauze). Made a Roman colonia in the early 3rd century AD, Elusa is documented as the capital of the province of Novempopulana by the Notitia Galliarum in the 4th century. The settlement of Tasta, mentioned by Pliny, may be identified with the city since the field that partly covers the ancient Elusa is called La Taste.

See also

Aquitani
Gallia Aquitania

References

Bibliography

Further reading

Tribes of pre-Roman Gaul
Aquitani
Basque history
Tribes involved in the Gallic Wars